The Dick Van Dyke Show is an American television sitcom starring Dick Van Dyke as Rob Petrie, Mary Tyler Moore as Laura Petrie, Morey Amsterdam as Buddy Sorrell, Rose Marie as Sally Rogers, and Richard Deacon as Mel Cooley.

The series ran for five seasons on CBS, lasting 158 half-hour episodes, all filmed in black-and-white.  Creator/writer Carl Reiner had told the cast from the beginning that if the show made it through five seasons, that would be its maximum run.

Series overview

All five seasons have been released on DVD by Image Entertainment.

Episodes

Pilot (1960)

Season 1 (1961–1962)
Season 1 of The Dick Van Dyke Show consisted of 30 black-and-white half-hour episodes airing on CBS.
The first season's opening credits consisted of photographs of the show's characters, with the text reading the names onscreen against a black background.
Recurring Character Debuts: Rob Petrie, Laura Petrie, Richie Petrie, Buddy Sorrell, Sally Rogers, Mel Cooley, Alan Brady, Millie Helper, Jerry Helper.

Season 2 (1962–1963)
Season 2 of The Dick Van Dyke Show consisted of 32 black-and-white half-hour episodes.
Beginning with this season, The Dick Van Dyke Show introduced a new opening sequence, which consisted of two versions, which were filmed after filming "The Two Faces Of Rob." The opening credits featuring photographs of the show's characters, and the text reading their names onscreen were discontinued. The opening credits took place in the Petrie's living room: one has Rob tripping over the ottoman, and the other  has him sidestepping the ottoman. Both versions remained in use, interchangeably between episodes, until the show's run ended on June 1, 1966. 
Beginning with the episode "It May Look Like a Walnut", the episode title began appearing onscreen.
{{Episode table
|background=#FF5F5F
|overall=2
|season=2
|title=24
|writer=21
|director=16
|airdate=15
|prodcode=7
|episodes=

{{Episode list
| EpisodeNumber   = 50
| EpisodeNumber2  = 20
| Title           = It May Look Like a Walnut
| DirectedBy      = Jerry Paris
| WrittenBy       = Carl Reiner
| OriginalAirDate = 
| ProdCode        = 51
| ShortSummary    = Rob enjoys a scary sci-fi movie on TV while Laura cowers under the bed covers so as to not hear it. When the show ends, Rob further tortures Laura by telling the tale of Kolak, a visitor from the planet Twilo who resembles Danny Thomas and deploys walnuts to steal Earthlings' thumbs and imaginations. Rob awakes in the morning to a living room strewn with walnuts and Laura preparing scrambled walnuts for Rob's breakfast. Everyone at the office is acting as if Kolak really existed. Is Rob dreaming or is Laura having her revenge?

Note: In 1997, TV Guide ranked this episode #15 on its list of the 100 Greatest Episodes. In 2009, it moved to #13. In 2021, a clip from this episode is also shown in the Wandavision episode "Previously On". Also in 2021, the first episode of Wandavision, "Filmed Before a Live Studio Audience" is a tribute to sitcoms of the 1950s and early 1960s, especially The Dick Van Dyke Show, to the point that Wandavison'''s producers talked to Dick Van Dyke himself for his advice to keep the episode as authentic as possible.https://www.emmys.com/news/features/not-your-mothers-suburbs
| LineColor       = FF5F5F
}}

}}

Season 3 (1963–1964)
Season 3 of The Dick Van Dyke Show consisted of 32 black-and-white half-hour episodes.
Recurring Character Debuts: Stevie Parsons (Richard Schaal).

Season 4 (1964–1965)
Season 4 of The Dick Van Dyke Show consisted of 32 black-and-white half-hour episodes.
The 100th episode of The Dick Van Dyke Show (Romance, Roses and Rye Bread) airs.

Season 5 (1965–1966)
Season 5 of The Dick Van Dyke Show'' consisted of 32 black-and-white half-hour episodes.

References

Dick Van Dyke
Dick Van Dyke Show